United States gubernatorial elections were held on November 3, 1987, in three states and one territory.

Election results
A bolded state name features an article about the specific election.

 
Gubernatorial elections